Maura Stanton (born September 9, 1946), is an American poet, and writer.

Biography
Maura Stanton was born to Joseph Stanton, a salesman, and Wanda Haggard Stanton, a nurse, in Evanston, Illinois.  She received her B.A. from the University of Minnesota in 1969, and her M.F.A. in 1971 from the University of Iowa.

She married Richard Cecil in 1972.  She has taught at the State University of New York at Cortland (1972–1973), the University of Richmond (1973–1977), Humboldt State University (1977–1978), the University of Arizona (1978–1982), and Indiana University, since 1982.  She was also named as the distinguished author in residence at Mary Washington College for the 1981–1982 academic year.

Her first book of poetry, SNOW ON SNOW, won the Yale Series of Younger Poets Award in 1975, and was reissued by Carnegie-Mellon University Press in 1993 as part of its contemporary classics series. Her second book, CRIES OF SWIMMERS, was published by the University of Utah Press in 1984 and was reissued by Carnegie-Mellon University Press in 1991.  Her work appeared in Ploughshares.

Awards
 Lawrence Foundation Prize in Fiction from Michigan Quarterly Review in 1982
 Frances Steloff Fiction Prize in 1975
 National Endowment for the Arts grants in 1974 and 1982
 1998 Nelson Algren Awards "Ping-Pong"
 2001 Richard Sullivan Award in Short Fiction
 2003 Michigan Literary Fiction Award

Works
 Little-Known Birl of The Inner Eye (after the picture by Morris Graves), Oxford Poetry Vol III No 1 (Winter 1986)
 Through the Dark, Caffine Destiny online
 Royal Harp, The Atlantic, October 2008
 God's Ode to Creation, Verse Daily

Poetry books

Short story books

Novels

Criticism
 A Relative Stranger, Ploughshares, Winter 1990–91
 What Keeps Us Here, Ploughshares, Winter 1992–93

Anthologies

Ploughshares 
 The Pear Orchard, Ploughshares, Summer 1972
 The Robber Bridegroom, Ploughshares, Spring 1975
 Circles, Ploughshares, Spring 1977
 Bathroom Walls, Ploughshares, Spring 1977
 New Neighbors in the South, Ploughshares, Spring 1977
 Heaven, Ploughshares, Winter 1984
 Attendant Lord, Ploughshares, Winter 1984
 The Cuckoo Clock, Ploughshares, Winter 1984
 Space, Ploughshares, Spring 1985
 March, Ploughshares, Spring 1985
 The Palace, Ploughshares, Fall 1985
 (guest editor), Ploughshares, Spring 1989
 Number Seventeen, Ploughshares, Fall 1991
 The House of Cleopatra, Ploughshares, Spring 1992
 Squash Flowers, Ploughshares, Spring 1997
 Ben Nevis, Ploughshares, Winter 1997–98
 Happiness, Ploughshares, Winter 1997–98
 Milk of Human Kindness, Ploughshares, Fall 2001
 Glass House, Ploughshares, Fall 2001

References

External links
 Heather Madden, An Interview with Maura Stanton, Memorious 7
 Maura Stanton, Photographs from the American Poetry Review Records, 1971–1998, Ms. Coll. 349

1946 births
Living people
University of Minnesota alumni
University of Iowa alumni
State University of New York faculty
University of Richmond faculty
Humboldt State University faculty
University of Arizona faculty
Indiana University faculty
American women poets
American women academics